Khmelnytskyi is a surname of Ukrainian origin often associated with the national hero of Ukraine Bohdan Khmelnytsky.

Notable persons
 Bohdan Khmelnytsky, a Hetman of Zaporizhian Host
 Yurii Khmelnytsky, a Hetman of Zaporizhian Host (son of Bohdan Khmelnytsky)
 Tymofiy Khmelnytsky (Tymish), another son of Bohdan Khmelnytsky, a Moldavian military person.
Efrosinia Yanenko-Khmelnytsky, niece of Bohdan Khemlnytsky and wife of Hetman Petro Doroshenko.
 Vitaliy Khmelnytskyi, a Soviet footballer and coach from the Orikhiv Raion
 Boris Khmelnitsky, a Soviet actor
 David Khmelnitskii, Russian physicist

Ukrainian-language surnames